CCTV Tower may refer to either of two structures in Beijing:
Central TV Tower, broadcasting tower finished 1992
CCTV Headquarters, office block finished 2008